Clan Chattan ( or ) is a unique confederation of Highland clans. The clan is distinctive in highland clan history in that it was acknowledged to be a community or confederation, of twelve separate Scottish clans, who each had their own clan chief recognized under Scottish law, but who were united under and bound to a superior chief of the confederation for mutual solidarity, sustenance and protection in the Middle Ages and early modern period in the Scottish Highlands.

Origins

There are multiple theories about the true origins of this clan:

 The name Chattan may came from the Catti who were a tribe of Gauls who had been driven out by the Romans.
 Another theory is that the name comes from Catav in Sutherland.
 The most widely accepted theory is that they descended from Gillichattan Mor who was the great servant of Saint Cathan. Gillichattan is believed to have been the co-arb or bailie of the abbey lands of Ardchattan.

In the time of Malcolm II of Scotland the Clan Chattan possessed the lands of Glen Loy and Loch Arkaig. It was here that Tor Castle became the clan chief's seat. Not much is certain about the history of the clan until towards the end of the 13th century. Eva, daughter of Gilpatric or Dougal Dall, 6th chief of Clan Chattan in Lochaber married Angus Mackintosh, 6th chief of the Clan Mackintosh in 1291. Thus Angus Mackintosh became 7th chief of Clan Chattan. They lived together at Tor Castle before withdrawing to Rothiemurchus due to the enmity of Aonghus Óg of Islay, chief of Clan Donald. As a result, the lands at Arkaig were occupied by the Clan Cameron who claimed that they had been abandoned. This was the beginning of a long and bitter feud that was fought between the Clan Chattan and Clan Cameron until 1666.

Clans belonging to Clan Chattan

Prior to the 14th century, the Clan Chattan was a conventional Scottish clan. However it evolved into an alliance or confederation of clans which was made up of

firstly of the descendants of the "blood" or the original clan (Clan Cattanach, Clan MacPherson, Clan MacPhail and Clan MacBean (or McBain), 
secondly of the Clan Mackintosh and their cadet branches (Clan Shaw, Clan Farquharson, the Ritchies, and Clan MacThomas) and 
thirdly of families who were not originally related by blood (Clan MacGillivray, Clan Davidson, the Macleans of Dochgarroch ('Clan Tearlach'), the MacQueens of Strathdearn, the MacIntyres of Badenoch ('Clan an t-Saoir') and the MacAndrews ('Clan Gillandrish').

The Skene assumption
Skene, however, gives a different version of how Clan Chattan was formed prior to the Mackintosh alliance. Clan Vuirich (Clan MacPherson) and Clan Day (Clan Davidson) were the original co-founders and referred to as old Clan Chattan. Added to these were six "stranger septs" who took protection from the clan. These were Clan Vic Ghillevray (Clan MacGillivray), the Clan Vean (Clan MacBean), the Clan Vic Govies, the Clan Tarrel, the Clan Cheanduy, and the Sliochd Gowchruim or Smiths.

However, Skene's phrase about 'stranger septs' and the names linked to them is not supported by any of the works of the respected Clan Chattan historians, and may therefore be a historical error by Skene, whose shortcomings have been noted by later writers - one of Skene's harshest critics was the Scottish philologist Alexander Macbain.

Sir Æneas Mackintosh/Charles-Fraser Mackintosh assumption
Noted historian of Clan Chattan, Charles Fraser-Mackintosh, in his 'An Account of the Confederation of Clan Chattan; its kith and kin' (the work known as 'Minor Septs of Clan Chattan') publishes the list of 16 associated tribes of Clan Chattan, along with an associated date reference, as written down by Sir Æneas Mackintosh. It begins with The Clan vic Gillivray, 1271. The second clan is The Clan Wurrich (Macpherson), 1291 and the third is The Clan Vean (Macbeans), 1292; then the fourth is The Clan Day (Davidsons), 1350. Others follow including (No.9) The Clan Tearlich (Macleans of the North), 1400, (No.10) The Clan Revan (Macqueens), 1400 and (No.14) The Clan Phail (Macphails), 1500.

In his 'The MacKintoshes and Clan Chattan' (1903), A. M. MacKintosh arranges his chapters to provide a history of Clan Chattan, its chiefs and its MacKintosh branches, then in Chapter XV details the 'Tribes and Families of Clan Chattan other than the Mackintoshes of Inverness-shire'.

 He begins (page 405) with the heading 'Clans Springing from the Mackintoshes': the Shaws, the Farquharsons, the MacKintoshes of Dalmunzie, the McCombies and Clan Thomas.
 Then A. M. Mackintosh comes to Part II of this chapter headed 'Clans Supposed to be of the Blood of the Old Clan Chattan' (i.e. not MacKintoshes, but members of Eva's family): the MacPhersons, the Cattanachs, the MacBeans and the MacPhails.
 The author then covers in Part III of the same chapter, headed (page 496) 'Clans Not of the Blood of either MackIntoshes or Old Clan Chattan': the MacGillivrays, the Davidsons, the Macleans of Dochgarroch, Clan Tarril, the Smiths or Gows, the MacQueens or Clan Revan, Clan Andrish and the Clarks or Clan Chlerich.

The Members Today
Today, the Clan Chattan Association, which is based in Scotland with members across the world, lists the following principal clans that comprise Clan Chattan:

 Clan Davidson
 Clan Farquharson
 Clan MacBean
 Clan MacGillivray
 Clan MacKintosh
 Clan MacPhail
 Clan MacPherson
 Clan MacQueen of Strathdearn
 Clan MacThomas
 Clan Shaw of Tordarroch
 MacIntyres in Badenoch
 Maclean of Dochgarroch (the Macleans of the North), (See 15th century, Battle of Harlow)

Chiefs

The following is a list of the traditional chiefs of the Clan Chattan before marriage between Eva, heiress of Clan Chattan, with the Chief of Clan Mackintosh, through whose marriage a new line of Mackintosh Captains (Chiefs) of Clan Chattan was created : See: Chiefs of Clan Mackintosh for later chiefs of Clan Chattan. In 1942, the Lyon Court separated the leadership of Clan MacKintosh and Clan Chattan. The leadership of Clan Chattan passed to the Mackintosh of Torcastle line.

Council of Clan Chattan

The council of Clan Chattan comprises eight Chiefs, who represent all of the individual clans, as President and Vice Presidents:

 John Mackintosh of Mackintosh (President)
 Philip Farquharson (Vice President)
 James Brodie Macpherson of Cluny (Vice President)
 Iain Shaw of Tordarroch (Vice President)
 James McBain of McBain (Vice President)
 Grant Guthrie Davidson of Davidston (Vice President)
 Andrew MacThomas of Finegand (Vice President)
 The Very Reverend Allan MacLean of Dochgarroch (Vice President)

Of the  remaining clans of Clan Chattan:
Clan MacGillivray has a clan Commander but no claimant to the chiefship
Clan MacPhail's last reported chief died in Australia in the early 1900s
Clan MacQueen's chiefly line moved to New Zealand and although descendants remain there has been no claimant to the chiefship.

Clan Association

The activities of the Clan are carried on by the Clan Chattan Association, a descendant of the original association established in 1727 for the purpose of defending the interests of the clan "against all who would seek the injury of any of its subscribers".

In the nineteenth century, many clan societies and associations emerged, with the aim of promoting social interaction between people linked by a common name, and interest in their clan's history. Among these was the second Clan Chattan Association, founded in Glasgow in 1893. Initial support for the association was strong with the meetings, lectures and dances described as "a brilliant success", but it faded out by about 1900. Even so, clan historians of that period produced several works which are still used today.

In the summer of 1933, the third Clan Chattan Association was founded in London. Now based in Scotland, the association has worldwide membership. It organizes a number of activities, such as the annual events in early August at Moy Hall in conjunction with the Highland Field Sports Fair. Members are kept informed of events through the annual journal of the association.

400th Anniversary of the 1609 Band of Union
On 6 August 2009 the Chiefs of Clan Chattan's clans and other members of these clans came together in Inverness to mark the 400th anniversary of the 1609 Clan Chattan Band of Union and signed a new Band of Union to renew their historic connection.

Clan profile

Plant badge: Red Whortleberry Latin vaccinium vitis-idaea
Crest badge: A cat salient, proper.
Clan chief's motto: Touch not the catt but a glove (slightly different from the motto of the Chief of Clan Mackintosh, which is Touch not the cat bot a glove - i.e. 'cat' with 1 'T' and 'bot' instead of 'but').

Chief

The Chief of Clan Mackintosh had been at the same time Captain of Clan Chattan, until the death of Alfred Donald Mackintosh of Mackintosh CBE, who chose as his heir to the Mackintosh inheritance Rear-Admiral Lachlan Donald Makintosh CB DSO DSC. The omission of a stipulation in Alfred's will, concerning inheritance of the captaincy of Clan Chattan, led The Lord Lyon of the day to create the historic separation of the two titles. Lachlan became The Mackintosh of Mackintosh, and his cousin Duncan Alexander Eliott Mackintosh became Mackintosh of Mackintosh-Torcastle, and Head of the hail kin of Clan Chattan.

Duncan Alexander Eliott Mackintosh of Mackintosh-Torcastle was born on 1 December 1884 and died on 29 May 1966. He married Ellen Primrose Smith and they had three sons and two daughters. He was succeeded by his eldest son and second child, Kenneth Mackintosh, born 23 November 1916, who became the 32nd Chief of Clan Chattan. He married Margaret Farmer and had two children. According to Burke's Peerage, his heir was their eldest son Duncan Alexander John Mackintosh, born in 1946. However, a genealogy published in an updated history of the Clan Mackintosh noted that Duncan died young, and that his younger brother Malcolm Mackintosh (born 20 October 1950) succeeded their father, who died in 1976, as 33rd Chief of Clan Chattan, becoming styled as Malcolm Mackintosh of Mackintosh-Torcastle and Clan Chattan.

Tartan
The individual Clans of Clan Chattan have their own tartans. However, there is a Clan Chattan tartan, formerly known as Mackintosh Chief, recognised by The Lord Lyon in 1938.

See also
Battle of the North Inch
Battle of Invernahavon
Battle of Palm Sunday

References

External links

Celtic clans
Highlands and Islands of Scotland
Clans
Clans
Names by culture
Clans
Clans
Clans
Clans and families
Chattan Confederation